Tridrepana arikana is a moth in the family Drepanidae first described by Shōnen Matsumura in 1921. It is found in China, India and Taiwan.

The wingspan is 24–28 mm.

The larvae feed on the leaves of Sapindus mukorossi and Koelreuteria elegans formosana. At rest, the larvae keep their head and thorax curled backward, overlapping the abdomen laterally, thus resembling bird droppings. When disturbed, the larva scratches the leaf surface with the posterior portion of the abdomen and makes sharp clicking sounds by rapidly pounding its mandible against the leaf. Mature larvae curve a leaf margin and fix it with silk at the leaf tip, where pupation takes place in a thin cocoon near the edge of the folded leaf.

Subspecies
Tridrepana arikana arikana (Taiwan)
Tridrepana arikana emina Chu & Wang, 1988 (China: Hainan)
Tridrepana arikana falcipennis (Warren, 1922) (Bhutan, China: Guangdong, Guangxi)

References

Moths described in 1921
Drepaninae
Taxa named by Shōnen Matsumura